Laughing Heirs is a 1933 German comedy film directed by Max Ophüls and starring Heinz Rühmann, Max Adalbert, Lien Deyers and Friedrich Ettel.  It was shot at the Babelsberg and Tempelhof Studios in Berlin and on location in the Rhineland. The film's sets were designed by the art director Benno von Arent.The premiere was on 6 March 1933.

Synopsis
A young salesman may inherit a wine-estate on one condition: he can't drink a drop of alcohol for at least a month.

Cast
 Heinz Rühmann as Peter Frank
 Lien Deyers as Gina, Robert Stumms Tochter
 Ida Wüst as Britta Bockelmann
 Max Adalbert as Justus Bockelmann
 Lizzi Waldmüller as Liane Heller
 Julius Falkenstein as Dr. Weinhöppel, Notar
 Walter Janssen as Robert Stumm
 Friedrich Ettel as Schlemmel, Kellermeister
 Elfriede Jera as Sekretärin von Robert Stamm
 Heinrich Gotho as Verwandter bei der Testamentseröffnung
 Illo Gutschwager as Junger Gast bei Schlemmel
 Friedl Haerlin as Nebenrolle
 Vera Spohr as Junge Zugreisende
 Walter Steinbeck as Ein Fahrgast
 Max Wilmsen as Schiffspassagier

References

Bibliography

External links
 

1933 films
1933 comedy films
German comedy films
Films of the Weimar Republic
1930s German-language films
Films directed by Max Ophüls
Films about wine
UFA GmbH films
Films shot at Babelsberg Studios
Films shot at Tempelhof Studios
German black-and-white films
1930s German films